Kaliyugaya may refer to:

 Kaliyugaya (novel), a 1957 novel by Martin Wickremasinghe
 Kaliyugaya (film), a 1981 Sri Lankan drama film, adapted from the novel